This is a list of Estonian television related events from 2020.

Events
 Eesti Laul 2020

Debuts

Television shows

Ending this year

Births

Deaths

See also
 2020 in Estonia

References

2020s in Estonian television